Allocinopus is a genus of beetles in the family Carabidae, containing the following species:

 Allocinopus angustulus Broun, 1912
 Allocinopus belli Larochelle & Lariviere, 2005
 Allocinopus bousqueti Larochelle & Lariviere, 2005
 Allocinopus latitarsis Broun, 1911
 Allocinopus scuplticollis Broun, 1903
 Allocinopus smithi Broun, 1912
 Allocinopus wardi Larochelle & Lariviere, 2005

References

Harpalinae